Fernando Antonio Gutiérrez Fernández (born 4 December 1980) is a Chilean former professional footballer and manager.

Managerial career
From 2014 to 2021 Gutiérrez worked as the assistant coach of Mario Salas in several clubs, even managing Colo-Colo in the 2019 Copa Chile. In September 2021, he took the challenge of managing to Deportes Colina in the Segunda División Profesional de Chile.

References

External links
 
 Gutiérrez at Football Lineups
 

1980 births
Living people
Footballers from Santiago
Chilean footballers
Audax Italiano footballers
Unión Española footballers
Curicó Unido footballers
A.C. Barnechea footballers
Chilean Primera División players
Primera B de Chile players
Association football central defenders
Chilean football managers
Chilean expatriate football managers
Segunda División Profesional de Chile managers
Chilean expatriate sportspeople in Peru
Chilean expatriate sportspeople in Egypt
Expatriate football managers in Peru
Expatriate football managers in Egypt